Henry Howell (1920–1997) was an American politician from Virginia.

Henry Howell may also refer to:

Henry Howell (Mormon) (1828–1896), Mormon pioneer
Henry Howell (baseball), American Negro league baseball player
Harry Howell (cricketer) (Henry Howell, 1890–1932), footballer and cricketer
Harry Howell (ice hockey) (Henry Vernon Howell, born 1932), ice hockey player
Henry Ward Howell (1889–1962), American architect, partner of Edwards, Plunkett, and Howell

See also
Harry Howell (disambiguation)